Aleksander Lasik (born 1953) is a Polish historian specializing in the history of the Schutzstaffel (SS) within German concentration camps. A professor at the Kazimierz Wielki University in Bydgoszcz, he has worked as an historian for Poland's Institute of National Remembrance.

Lasik is known, in particular, for having helped to compile a database, which he started in 1982 when he was writing his PhD, of 25,000 names of those who staffed concentration camps in German-occupied Poland during the Holocaust. The list includes 9,686 names of personnel at the Auschwitz concentration camp. The Institute of National Remembrance added the database to its website in 2017.

Lasik obtained his PhD in 1988 from Adam Mickiewicz University in Poznań. He was one of the historical consultants for the BBC series Auschwitz: The Nazis and "The Final Solution" (2005).

Selected works
 Załoga SS w KL Auschwitz w latach 1940–1945. Bydgoszcz: Wydawn. Uczelniane Wyższej Szkoly Pedagogicznej w Bydgoszczy, 1994. 
 "Historical-Sociological Profile of the Auschwitz SS ". 
 "Rudolf Höss: Manager of Crime". 
 "Organizational Structure of Auschwitz Concentration Camp". 
 "The Apprehension and Punishment of the Auschwitz Concentration Camp Staff". 
Sztafety Ochronne w systemie niemieckich obozów koncentracyjnych. Oświęcim: Auschwitz-Birkenau Museum, 2007. 
"The matter of citizenship among SS-personnel at KL Auschwitz in the years 1940–1945". Auschwitz Studies, 26, 2012, pp. 49–125.

References

Further reading
"List of publications". Kazimierz Wielki University.

1953 births
Adam Mickiewicz University in Poznań alumni
Historians of the Holocaust in Poland
Academic staff of Kazimierz Wielki University in Bydgoszcz
Living people
20th-century Polish historians
Polish male non-fiction writers
21st-century Polish historians